HD 59890 is a class G3Ib yellow supergiant star in the constellation Puppis. Its apparent magnitude is 4.65 and it is approximately 1,360 light years away based on parallax.

References

Puppis
G-type supergiants
CD-30 4620
036514
2881
059890